Gymnopilus dilepis is a species of mushroom in the family Hymenogastraceae. This species is found in India, Malaysia, and North America.  It was given its current name by mycologist Rolf Singer in 1951. It contains psilocybin and related hallucinogenic substances.

Phylogeny
Gymnopilus dilepis is in the lepidotus-subearlei infrageneric grouping within the genus Gymnopilus.

See also
List of Gymnopilus species

References

dilepis
Fungi of Asia
Fungi of Europe
Fungi of North America
Fungi described in 1871
Taxa named by Miles Joseph Berkeley
Taxa named by Christopher Edmund Broome